Goruk Pordung is an Indian politician who is serving as Member of 10th Arunachal Pradesh Assembly from Bameng Assembly constituency. In 2019 Arunachal Pradesh Legislative Assembly election, he defeated Kumar Waii with the margin of 393 votes.

Controversy 
In 2019, a case registered against him for raping a doctor. In December 2019, Gauhati High Court rejected his bail. In January 2020, Supreme Court of India ordered Special Investigation Team probe against him. In February 2021, court granted him interim bail.

References 

Arunachal Pradesh MLAs 2019–2024
Bharatiya Janata Party politicians from Arunachal Pradesh
Living people
Year of birth missing (living people)